Baram (Baraamu, Bhramu) is a critically endangered Sino-Tibetan language spoken in Nepal. Speakers are shifting to Nepali. Dialects are Dandagaun and Mailung.

Locations
Baram is spoken in Dandagaun and Mailung VDCs in central and southern Gorkha District, Gandaki Province, and in Takhu village up the Doraundi Khola (east side above Chorgate, near Kumhali) (Ethnologue). There are possibly about 7 villages in Dhading District, Bagmati Province.

References

Mahakiranti languages
Languages of Nepal
Languages of Gandaki Province